Ethel Glenn Hier (25 June 1889 
– 14 January 1971) was an American composer, teacher and pianist of Scottish ancestry.

Life
Ethel Glenn Hier was born in Madisonville, a neighborhood of Cincinnati, Ohio. She studied at Ohio Wesleyan University and the Cincinnati Conservatory of Music, where she graduated in piano in 1908. She continued her education in 1911 with composition classes, and in 1917 entered the Institute of Musical Art (later Juilliard).

After completing her studies, Hier worked as a composer and became a teacher of piano and composition in Cincinnati and then New York. She died in Winter Park, Florida.

Works
Selected works include:
Carolina suite for orchestra
Dreamin' town (Text: Paul Laurence Dunbar)
The bird in the rain (Text: Elinor Wylie)
The Hour and the Return, song cycle (Text: Sara Teasdale)
Down in the Glen
If You Must Go, Go Quickly

References

External links
 Ethel Glenn Heir plays "Fantasy" from YouTube

1889 births
1971 deaths
20th-century classical composers
American music educators
American women music educators
American women classical composers
American classical composers
Educators from Cincinnati
Musicians from Cincinnati
Ohio Wesleyan University alumni
Juilliard School alumni
MacDowell Colony fellows
20th-century American women musicians
20th-century American composers
Classical musicians from Ohio
20th-century women composers